Dawid Kocyła (born 23 July 2002) is a Polish professional footballer who plays as a winger for Ekstraklasa club Wisła Płock.

References

Living people
2002 births
Association football forwards
Polish footballers
Poland youth international footballers
Poland under-21 international footballers
GKS Bełchatów players
Wisła Płock players
Bruk-Bet Termalica Nieciecza players
Ekstraklasa players
I liga players
Sportspeople from Bełchatów